Boonoonoonoos is the fifth studio album by Boney M., released in September 1981.

Background
Despite producer Frank Farian having announced by the end of 1979 that Boney M. were to take a break, recording sessions for a new album began in the spring of 1980, and the title "Boonoonoonoos" (a Caribbean word for "Happiness", derived from Latin "Bonus" = good) already appeared as one of the first completed tracks, a cover of Larry Dillon's ska-title "Train to Skaville", which was intertwined with new rap parts as "That's Boonoonoonoos". Two of the new recordings, "I See A Boat On The River" and "My Friend Jack" were issued to promote The Magic of Boney M. - 20 Golden Hits in April 1980.

Farian invited the singers Liz Mitchell and Marcia Barrett and his crew of musicians to Nice in the summer of 1980, where several new songs were recorded. A new double A-side single "Children Of Paradise"/"Gadda-Da-Vida" was released in September, announcing the as yet untitled new album to be released in November '80. The single reached number 11 in Germany, but in the UK their popularity was now quickly slipping. When released in February 1981, the single peaked at a disappointing number 66. In the meantime, Farian had decided to revise the whole album.

While new pressings of "Children of Paradise" now promoted "The Magic of Boney M." on the back cover, the band instead issued another single in December, a cover version of "Felicidad (Margherita)" backed with "Strange". "Felicidad", originally recorded by Italian band Massara as "Margherita (Love In The Sun)" in 1979, managed to get Boney M. into the German Top 10 again and it became a sizeable hit in most of Europe as well. In the Netherlands, the single was released with "Strange" as the A-side.

At the same time, singer Marcia Barrett issued the solo single "You" / "I'm Lonely", produced by John Edmed, and written by Kelvin James. Released in Germany in December 1980, and belatedly released in the UK in September 1981, the single failed to chart in either of the countries. Another song from the same sessions, "Breakaway", ended up on Boonoonoonoos as a Boney M. track with Frank Farian on lead vocals.

New recording sessions took place in the spring of 1981. The band flew to Jamaica in August 1981  to record a TV special and perform live in concert with Rita Marley, shoot photos for the album innersleeve and a projected photo book that was never published, and one of the final songs "Silly Confusion" was recorded in Bob Marley's Tuff Gong studios in Kingston.

Boonoonoonoos – originally intended to be released as a double-album – was subsequently trimmed to a one disc, thirteen track release.  A limited edition double album was, however, issued in Germany, France and the UK, containing slightly longer versions of certain songs, but with the same number of tracks.

Singles 
The first single to be lifted off the finished Boonoonoonoos album in Germany was double A-side "Malaika"/"Consuela Biaz" in June 1981 which became the first Boney M. single since their breakthrough not to reach the German Top 10. The single was not released in the UK.

"We Kill The World (Don't Kill The World)" was the second single, released in November, and marked the first single since "Belfast" featuring Marcia Barrett as the lead singer. It peaked at #12 in the German charts.

Track listing
Note: Tracklist based on cassette/CD releases. Lengths vary between releases.

Side A:
"Boonoonoonoos" (Frank Farian, Giorgio Sgarbi, Catherine Courage, Fred Jay) - 4:37
"That's Boonoonoonoos / Train to Skaville" (Frank Farian, Larry Dillon, Rainer Maria Ehrhart) / "I Shall Sing" (Van Morrison) - 5:56
"Silly Confusion" (Frank Farian, Dietmar Kawohl, Mats Björklund, Harry Baierl, Catherine Courage) - 7:12
"Ride to Agadir" (Mike Batt) - 5:09
"Jimmy" (Frank Farian, Johan Daansen, Brad Howell) - 4:07
"African Moon" (Frank Farian, Helmut Rulofs, Liz Mitchell, Catherine Courage) - 2:55

Side B:
"We Kill the World (Don't Kill the World)" (Frank Farian, Giorgio & Gisela Sgarbi) - 6:28
"Homeland Africa (Ship Ahoy)" (Kenneth Gamble, Frank Farian, Leon Huff) - 4:20
"Malaika" (Farian, Reyam, Traditional) - 3:27
"Consuela Biaz" (Farian, Courage, O'Hara) - 4:37
"Breakaway" (Kelvin James) - 4:18
"Sad Movies" (John D. Loudermilk) - 3:22
"Goodbye My Friend" (Farian, Rulofs, Courage) - 5:25

Personnel

 Liz Mitchell - lead vocals (A2, A5, A6, B3, B4, B6 & B7), backing vocals
 Marcia Barrett - lead vocals (B1, B5), backing vocals
 Frank Farian - lead vocals (A4 & B5), backing vocals
 Bobby Farrell - rap (track A2), spoken intro (B1)
 Cathy Bartney (La Mama) - backing vocals (A3, B1 ("Don't Kill the World") & B3)
 Madeleine Davis (La Mama) - backing vocals (A3, B1 ("Don't Kill the World") & B3)
 Patricia Shockley (La Mama) - backing vocals (A3, B1 ("Don't Kill the World") & B3)
 Brian Paul - lead- and backing vocals (B1 ("Don't Kill the World"))
 Brian Sletten - backing vocals (B1 ("Don't Kill the World"))
 Dave King - bass guitar
 Günther Gebauer - bass guitar
 Helmut Rulofs - guitar

 Johan Daansen - guitar
 Mats Björklund - guitar
 Curt Cress - drums
 Keith Forsey - drums
 Harry Baierl - keyboards
 Kristian Schultze - keyboards
 Max Greger Jr. - keyboards
 Dino Solera - saxophone (A5, A6)
 Tom Scott - saxophone (A1, B5)
 London Philharmonic Orchestra - orchestra (A4)

Production
 Frank Farian - producer
 Christian Kolonovits - arranger
 Geoff Bastow - arranger
 Giorgio Sgarbi - arranger
 Harry Baierl - arranger
 Stefan Klinkhammer - arranger
 Tammy Grohé - sound engineer
 Recorded at Abbey Road Studios London, AIR Studios London, Audio Studio Berlin, Atlantic Studios Munich, Rainbow Studios Munich, Union Studios Munich,  Vigilant Studios Nice, Bob Marley Studios Kingston Jamaica, Hitsville Recording Studios Hollywood California. Mixed at Farian Studios.

Charts

Weekly charts

Certifications and sales

Reissued
 1994: CD, BMG, 74321 21267 2 
 2007: CD, Sony BMG Music Entertainment, 88697094802
 2011: Boney M. Original Album Classics, 5 CD, Sony Music, 88697928702
 2017: Boney M. Complete, 9 LP, Sony Music, 88985406971

References

External links
 Rate Your Music, detailed discography
 Discogs.com, detailed discography
 [ Allmusic, biography, discography etc.]
 Boney M. FAQ

1981 albums
Boney M. albums
Albums produced by Frank Farian
Atlantic Records albums
Hansa Records albums